Rubavu District is one of the seven districts of the country district (akarere) in Western Province, Rwanda. Its capital is Gisenyi, a large beach resort and border city. It has a total surface area of 388.4 Km2.

Geography 
The district lies on the shores of Lake Kivu, around the city of Gisenyi, and just across the border from the Congolese city of Goma. 

It is bordered in the east by Nyabihu District, west and north by the Democratic Republic of Congo and south by Rutsiro district and is 154.7 km from city of Kigali the capital of Rwanda which is 2 hours and 53 minutes drive. Its geographic location and related features such as lake kivu helps the district to be a business and tourism hub (especially through cross border trade with DRC). The District of Rubavu is composed of 12 administrative sectors, 80 Cells and 525 Villages (Imidugudu). Geography of the District Rainfall in Rubavu District varies between 1200 mm and 1500 mm per year. The Land of Northwest part of the District has a very rich soil, but shallow, volcanic ash and lava decomposed, while land in the south east has deep soils but poor, often acidic, sandy clay and leached by high erosion, It is also close to Mount Nyiragongo, an active volcano.  On 2 May 2021, a new eruption started. 

Rubavu District has a very strategic location as it is one hour drive away from Volcanoes National Park and has a good stopover to or from Nyungwe National Park, and a suitable relaxation point from the hectic Gorilla trekking or Chimpanzee trekking respectively

Demography 
In 2012, The fourth Rwanda Population and Housing Census (PHC4), enumerated 403,662 residents in Rubavu District on a density of 1039 Inhabitants/Km2 , where 51.7 % of the total population are females and 48.3 % are male. Total population in urban areas is 149,209 which makes 37% of the total district's population whereas 254,453 (63%) reside in rural areas. The district's population represents 3.8% of the total country's population and 16.3 % of the Western Province population (2,471,239 inhabitants). The average house-hold size is 5.2 against 4.8 at national level, the population aged between 0-14 years old represented 43.8% and the population aged between 15 and 49 years old represented 47.8% while those above 50 years old represented 8.1%.

Tourism 
Tourism has been highlighted as the potential main economic sector for Rubavu District. In the last few years there has been a growth in the number of hotels and resorts in Rubavu. Rubavu is mostly a weekend destination for Rwandan's wanting to relax by Lake Kivu for a weekend, but also for international visitors on a safari to Rwanda. Rubavu is also the start of the Congo Nile Trail.

Beach Bars 
Located a short distance away across the bridge over Sebeya River from Rubavu Public Beach and the city center is a series of beach bars on the shores of Lake Kivu. This place is rather lively on weekends and attracts visitors from Democratic Republic of Congo and Kigali. The series of beach bars offer live music food and drinks on the lake's edge

Mount Rubavu climbing 
Gisenyi city is located at the heel of Mount Rubavu. A climb at the top of the mountain rewards you with exceptional views of Gisenyi town and the entire Lake Kivu as well as the neighboring city of Goma. Mount Rubavu also has an interesting history as it had the bases of Germans during their battles with Belgians in the First World War. There is also rock climbing sport at the mountain.

Pfunda tea estate 

Is on the main estate where tea growing takes place producing  some of the world's best teas, It lies between Virunga Volcano and the rich volcanic soil nine kilometers from Rubavu town, farmers in this plantation are welcoming and willing to take on a tour in the plantation showing how to pick a tea leaves and how they are processed to tea.

Gisenyi public beach 
This beach is created by a strip of yellow sand, grey and green water.

Rubona peninsula 
It is found from six kilometers from Rubavu town, it is on the Lac Kivu shores with hills steeply from the lake's foreshores and patches of green garden. It has sandy beaches suitable for swimming. Is a site of many boats and men carrying out fishing.

Kayaking on Lake Kivu 
This is another place on the waters which is very safe, the lake harbors no hippopotamus or crocodiles.

Congo Nile trail. 
Congo Nile is a 227 km trail along lake Kivu forming Kivu belt as it extends from Rubavu, continues through Rutsiro, then Karongi, up to Nyamasheke and ends at Rusizi District. It offers a tour on foot or on bike, it depends on tourists, with magnificent views of Lake Kivu.

Palm oil plantation 
In this district there are many palm oil plantations which also attract tourists.

Hotels and accommodation 
Rubavu District has many different hotels, lodges: Celena Hotel, Gorilla Lake Kivu Hotel, Hakuna Matata lodge, Kivu Peace View Hotel, Bora Smart Guest House, The Palm Beach Resort and others.

Sectors 
Rubavu district is divided into 12 sectors (imirenge): Bugeshi, Busasamana, Cyanzarwe, Gisenyi, Kanama, Kanzenze, Mudende, Nyakiliba, Nyamyumba, Nyundo, Rubavu and Rugerero.

See also 
Maison St Benoit

References 

 
 Inzego.doc — Province, District and Sector information from MINALOC, the Rwanda ministry of local government.

 
Districts of Rwanda